The 1982 Grand National (officially known as The Sun Grand National for sponsorship reasons) was the 136th running of the Grand National horse race that took place at Aintree Racecourse near Liverpool, England, on 3 April 1982.

The race was won by 7/1 favourite Grittar, ridden by amateur Dick Saunders, who at the age of 48 became, and remains, the oldest jockey to have won the Grand National.

Saunders retired after the race and became chairman of the Aintree stewards. Grittar finished fifth in the next year's National and 10th in 1984. The horse retired to his owner's Rutland base and died aged 25.

The race was also notable for being the first in which a female jockey, Geraldine Rees, completed the course. She rode Cheers to be the eighth and last of the finishers.

Leading contenders
Grittar was installed as a 7/1 favourite on the day of the race, due mostly to the Cheltenham and Liverpool Foxhunter Chase double in 1981  The victory at Liverpool was enough for him to get the support of BBC Radio Two commentator, Peter Bromley though several newspaper pundits expressed concern at the horse's being a hunter chaser. Forty-eight-year-old amateur rider Dick Saunders told trainer Frank Gilman to employ the services of a professional rider, Peter Scudamore for the big race, but Gilman insisted Saunders take the ride if fit. His age and amateur status did little to deter the betting public although leading professional gambler, Alex Bird exclaimed "I immediately pencilled him in for the '82 National, but I'm not happy about the jockey - I'll be keeping my money in my pocket." In preparation for the National, he won at a canter at Leicester before finishing a creditable sixth in the Cheltenham Gold Cup.

Finishing order

Non-finishers

Media coverage

BBC Grandstand covered the race with David Coleman fronting the coverage live from Aintree.

References

External links
Grand-national-world.co.uk

 1982
Grand National
Grand National
20th century in Merseyside